The 2018–19 Serie C was the fifth season of the unified Serie C division, the third tier of the Italian football league system.

Teams 
The league originally featured 60 teams. However, it saw the bankruptcy and subsequent withdrawal of Andria, Mestre, Reggiana and Vicenza.

To fill the vacancies in Serie B, Novara, Catania and Siena became the repechage candidates from Serie C, to the objection of Pro Vercelli and Ternana. However, on 10 August Lega B announced that a 19-team calendar would be commissioned for the 2018–19 and no repechage would take place.

The first team of Bassano Virtus was relocated to Vicenza as L.R. Vicenza Virtus. While its owner, had also acquired some assets from the liquidators of Vicenza.

On 3 August 2018, it was officially announced by the Italian Football Federation (FIGC) that Juventus Under 23 would take part in Serie C, making it the first "B Team" in Italy to do so since 1934. Also, Cavese and Imolese were admitted from Serie D to fill the vacancies created.

Due to several issues regarding vacancies and trials at both Serie B and Serie C level, the Serie C league committee delayed the season kickoff day to September, also hinting at the possibility of an indefinite delay because of the unclear situation. The season eventually kicked off on Saturday 15 September, but saw all games of Novara, Pro Vercelli, Ternana, Siena and Catania delayed indefinitely due to their judicial requests to be admitted to Serie B, as well as Viterbese, after the club threatened not to participate in Serie C due to their opposition to being admitted to the Southern group. Virtus Entella's second game was also delayed after the club was accepted on appeal for being readmitted to Serie B by the Regional Administrative Court of Lazio (TAR Lazio).

On 14 February 2019, Matera were excluded from Serie C for missing four consecutive matches which was followed by the exclusion of Pro Piacenza on 18 February 2019 after missing several games and presenting a makeshift team composed of teenagers and a physiotherapist in their final game, where they were beaten 20-0 by Cuneo.

Promotion and relegation rule changes 
On 30 January 2019, it was announced that five teams rather than the usual four would be promoted to Serie B for the 2019-20 season, after FIGC decided to incorporate an extra club in Serie B to bring the league up to 20 teams. The decision also meant that only seven clubs would be relegated to Serie D rather than the original eight.

Due to the exclusions of Pro Piacenza and Matera from the league, the football league committee, in accordance with the Italian Football Federation, agreed on 2 April 2019 to a change in the relegation rules, by decreasing the number of relegations to five as follows:

 Group A, which originally featured 20 teams, later reduced to 19 following the exclusion of Pro Piacenza, will have no direct relegation unless there are eight or more points between the last and second-last placed team at the conclusion of the regular season. In the case of less than eight points between the two bottom teams, a two-legged relegation playoff will be played.
 Group B (20 teams), as the only one that was not affected by league exclusion, will have a direct relegation for the bottom placed team in the regular season, plus a two-legged relegation playoff between the 18th and 19th placed team.
 Group C (19 teams, later reduced to 18 teams due to Matera's exclusion) will feature the same relegation system as in Group A.
 The two relegation playoff winners from Group A and Group C (or the respective second-last placed teams in the regular season, in case of no relegation playoff being held) will subsequently take part in another relegation playoff to determine the fifth team relegated to Serie D in 2019–20.

Relegated from Serie B 

Novara
Pro Vercelli
Ternana
Virtus Entella

Promoted from Serie D 
Gozzano (Girone A winners)
Pro Patria (Girone B winners and 2017–18 Serie D title holders)
Virtus Verona (Girone C winners)
Rimini (Girone D winners)
Albissola (Girone E winners)
Vis Pesaro  (Girone F winners)
Rieti (Girone G winners)
Potenza (Girone H winners)
Vibonese (Girone I winners)
Imolese (Girone D runner-up and playoff winner)
Cavese (Girone H runner-up and playoff winner)

Repechage 
 Juventus U23 (newly founded B team)

Stadia and locations

Group A (North & Central West)
7 teams from Tuscany, 6 teams from Piedmont, 2 teams from Emilia-Romagna, 2 teams from Sardinia, 2 teams from Liguria and 1 team from Lombardy.

Group B (North & Central East)
5 teams from Lombardy, 4 teams from Marche, 3 teams from Emilia-Romagna, 2 teams from Friuli-Venezia Giulia, 2 teams from Umbria, 2 teams from Veneto, 1 team from Abruzzo and 1 team from Trentino-Alto Adige.

Group C (South)
4 teams from Calabria, 4 teams from Campania, 4 teams from Sicily, 3 teams from Apulia, 2 teams from Basilicata, 2 teams from Lazio.

League tables

Group A (North & Central West)

Group B (North & Central East)

Group C (South)

Promotion play-offs

First Round 
If tied, higher-placed team advances.

|}

Second Round 
If tied, higher-placed team advances.

|}

Quarter-finals 
If tied on aggregate, higher-placed team advances.

|}

Semi-finals 
If tied on aggregate, higher-placed team advances.

|}

Finals 
If tied on aggregate, the winner is decided by extra-time and penalty shootout.

|}

Relegation play-outs

First Round 
Higher-placed team plays at home for second leg. If tied on aggregate, lower-placed team is relegated.

|}

Final 
If tied on aggregate, extra time and eventually penalty shoot-out are played. Losers are relegated.

|}

Top goalscorers

Note
1Player scored 1 goal in the play-offs.
3Player scored 3 goals in the play-offs.
4Player scored 4 goals in the play-offs.

References

External links
 Official website

Serie C seasons
3
Italy